Thomas Sinclair may refer to:

 Thomas Sinclair (politician, 1857–1940), Northern Irish Member of Parliament
 Thomas Sinclair (politician, 1838–1914), Ulster-Scots businessman and politician
 Thomas Sinclair Jr. (1841–1888), politician in Manitoba, Canada
 Tom Sinclair (born 1958), American athlete
 Tom Sinclair (footballer) (1880–1968), Scottish football goalkeeper
 Tommy Sinclair (footballer, born 1921) (born 1921), English footballer
 Tommy Sinclair (footballer, born 1897) (1897–1967), English footballer
 Tommy Sinclair (Scottish footballer), Scottish footballer
 Thomas Sinclair (writer), a contributor to the British Dictionary of National Biography
 Thomas Sinclair (died 1881), American businessman whose widow built the Brucemore mansion in Cedar Rapids, Iowa
 Thomas Sinclair, Australian actor in silent films such as The Kelly Gang (1920)
 Tom Sinclair, coxswain of Scottish lifeboat RNLB Emma Constance
 Thomas Sinclair, fictional character in the Killzone video games
 Albert Thomas Sinclair, American lawyer who corresponded with Archduke Joseph Karl of Austria about the Romani language

See also
 Thomas Sinclair Harrison (1898–?), South African World War I fighter ace
 Thomas Sinclair Holden (1906–1973), Australian politician and judge
 Sinclair Thomas (born 1968), British wheelchair basketball player and coach